The Smiths Falls Beavers were a professional baseball team that played for one season in 1937, in Smiths Falls, Ontario.

The team played as part of the Canadian–American League. Two players from the single-season team made it to the major leagues.  Matt Christopher, the well-known author of over a hundred sports books for young adults, made the team out of training camp, but was released early in the season.  

Ballpark: Canadian Pacific Recreation Grounds

Team Members included:
Xavier Rescigno (p)
Walt Lanfranconi (p)
Art Horsington (p)
Andy Palau (c)
Al Smith (2b)
Ernie Downer (cf)
Matt Christopher (3b)

Canadian–American League, 1937

References 

Defunct baseball teams in Canada
Defunct minor league baseball teams
Baseball teams in Ontario
1937 establishments in Ontario
Baseball teams established in 1937
1937 disestablishments in Ontario
Baseball teams disestablished in 1937
Smiths Falls